Tariq Mahmood Ahmad, Baron Ahmad of Wimbledon (born 3 April 1968), is a British businessman and a Conservative life peer. He was appointed Minister of State for the Middle East, North Africa, South Asia and United Nations at the Foreign, Commonwealth and Development Office.

Early years 
Born in Lambeth, to Punjabi-speaking immigrant parents from Pakistan, Tariq Ahmad was educated at Rutlish School, Merton Park, southwest London.

Career 
In 1991, he entered NatWest's Graduate Management programme, eventually working as Head of Marketing, Sponsorship and Branding and in 2000 went to work for AllianceBernstein. In 2004, he joined Sucden Financial, where he served on the Executive Committee and as Director of Marketing, Strategy and Research. He is an Associate of the Institute of Financial Services and a member of the Institute of Directors.

From 1999 to 2008 he served as vice-president of AMYA, a British Muslim youth organisation. From 2001 to 2006, he served as a governor of Wimbledon Park Primary school. He joined the Conservative Party in 1994. In 2002, he was elected a Councillor in Wimbledon. He contested Croydon North for the Conservatives in 2005. From 2008 to 2010, he served as Vice-Chairman of the Conservative Party.

He is a part of the Ahmadiyya Muslim Community, and was a national vice-president of the Ahmadiyya Muslim Association's youth organisation from 2003.

Parliamentary career 
On 13 January 2011, he was made a life peer, and was created Baron Ahmad of Wimbledon, of Wimbledon in the London Borough of Merton. He formally joined the House of Lords on 17 January. In 2014, Ahmad was promoted to Parliamentary Under-Secretary of State at DCLG. After the 2015 general election, he was appointed jointly as Minister for Skills and Aviation Security at the Department for Transport and Minister for Countering Extremism at the Home Office. In 2016, he was appointed Minister for Aviation, International Trade and Europe at the Department for Transport in the first May ministry.

After the 2017 general election, Ahmad was appointed Minister of State at the Foreign and Commonwealth Office with responsibilities to the Commonwealth, the United Nations, and the Prime Minister's Special Representative on Preventing Sexual Violence in Conflict, and later South Asia, the Middle East and North Africa.

Arms

Notes

References

External links
 

1968 births
British Ahmadis
British politicians of Pakistani descent
Conservative Party (UK) life peers
English people of Pakistani descent
Living people
People educated at Rutlish School
Life peers created by Elizabeth II